Maayanadhi is an 2020 Indian Tamil language drama film starring  Aadukalam Naren, Venba, Abi Saravanan and Appukutty in lead roles. The film is written, produced,  and directed by Ashok Thiagarajan in his directorial debut.

Cast 

 Venba as Kousalya 
 Aadukalam Naren as Kowsalya's Father
 Abi Saravanan as Senthil
 Appukutty as Mani
 Thamizh Venkat as Kowsalya's Uncle
 Durga Venugopal as Martina Miss

Production 

This project was officially launched in February 2018, Ashok Thiagarajan is making his debut as the Director and producer of the venture, under his newly established Raji Nila Mukil Films (RNM FILMS) Productions banner. Actors include Venba, Abi Saravanan and Aadukalam Naren, with Appukutty signed to play the lead role.

Bhavatharani was selected as music director. Meanwhile, Srinivas Devamsam, Gopi Krishna, and Mayil Krishnan was signed as cinematographer, editor, and art director respectively for this film.

Maayanadhi planning to release on 31 January 2020.

Soundtrack 
Soundtrack was composed by Bhavatharini. Yuvan Shankar Raja and Ameer attended the audio launch as chief guests.
Ganja Paarvai - Senthildas, Priyanka
Mayil Iragu - Priya Mali
Yaavum Ingu - Srisha

Release 
The Times of India gave the film two out of five stars and stated that "A better script would have helped them [the cast of the film] more". The Asian Age gave the film two-and-a-half out of five stars and wrote that " A taut narration and a little more coherence would have enhanced the film".

References

External links 
 

2020 films
2020s Tamil-language films
Indian drama films
2020 directorial debut films
2020 drama films
Films scored by Bhavatharini